Mahine Gwoelani Patu (born 10 September 2000) is a French Polynesian athlete specialising in the javelin throw. She has represented French Polynesia at the Pacific Games and Polynesian Championships in Athletics.

At the 2015 Pacific Games in Port Moresby she won bronze in the javelin. At the 2019 Pacific Games in Apia she won bronze in the javelin.

References

Living people
2000 births
French Polynesian javelin throwers